The Union of Bakers and Related Workers of Germany was a trade union representing workers in the baking industry in Germany.

The union was founded on 5 June 1885, at a meeting in Hamburg.  It was an early affiliate of the General Commission of German Trade Unions, and by 1904 had grown to 9,068 members.  In 1907, it merged with the Central Union of Confectionery and Gingerbread, to form the Central Union of Bakers and Confectioners.

Presidents
1890s: Pfeiffer
1895: Oskar Allmann

References

Bakers' and confectioners' trade unions
Trade unions in Germany
Trade unions established in 1885
Trade unions disestablished in 1907